A vibratory feeder is an instrument that uses vibration to "feed" material to a process or machine. Vibratory feeders use both vibration and gravity to move material. Gravity is used to determine the direction, either down, or down and to a side, and then vibration is used to move the material.  They are mainly used to transport a large number of smaller objects.

A belt weigher are used only to measure the material flow rate but weigh feeder can measure the flow material and also control or regulate the flow rate by varying the belt conveyor speed.

Industries Served
Versatile and rugged vibratory bowl feeders have been extremely used for automatic feeding of small to large and differently shaped industrial parts. They are the oldest but still commonly used automation machine available for aligning and feeding machine parts, electronic parts, plastic parts, chemicals, metallic parts, glass vials, pharmaceuticals, foods, miscellaneous goods etc. 
Available in standard and custom designs, vibratory bowl feeders have been largely purchased by varied industrial sectors for automating high-speed production lines and assembly systems. Some of the industries that use the service of this automation machine include:
 Pharmaceutical
 Automotive
 Electronic
 Food Processing
 Fast Moving Consumable Goods (FMCG)
 Packaging
 Metal working
 Glass
 Foundry
 Steel
 Construction
 Recycling
 Pulp and paper
 Plastics
 Uphill, (also known as salmon tables)

With these easy-to-use and high-performing part-feeding machines, customers from varied industrial sectors have achieved lower error rates, less power consumption, better profits, better rates of efficiency and less dependency on manpower.

See also
Bowl feeders

Industrial machinery